Hostinella is a form genus, used for bare dichotomously branching stems (axes) which have not been found in association with spore-forming organs or sporangia and so cannot be assigned to a more precise genus or species. Specimens assigned to this genus have been found in Bathurst Island, Canada, in the Bertie Formation of Upper Silurian age (around ), where the stems are approximately 1.2 mm in diameter; and in Lower Devonian Senni beds (from around ) where the axes have a straited external appearance and contain xylem with tracheids (diameter: 40 µm).

It is known to co-occur with Krithodeophyton.

References 

Silurian plants
Early Devonian plants
Prehistoric plant genera
Silurian first appearances
Early Devonian genus extinctions
Paleozoic life of Ontario
Paleozoic life of Nunavut
Bertie Formation
Prehistoric plants of North America